Kiss + Swallow is the debut album by IAMX and was released on 13 July 2004. It mostly consists of tracks that were recorded for the unreleased fourth studio album by Sneaker Pimps, which is dubbed "SP4" by the fans.

Overview
Kiss + Swallow was an extreme departure from Chris Corner's work with Sneaker Pimps.
Almost completely electronic, the album incorporates driving synth-rock ("Kiss + Swallow", "Your Joy Is My Low"), lush, atmospheric, melody driven ballads ("Mercy", "I Like Pretending", "Simple Girl") and groove-based, erotic electro ("Sailor", "Naked But Safe", "You Stick It In Me"). The album was recorded entirely in Chris Corner's private home studio in London between late 2003 and early 2004.

A demo version of this album also exists. This so-called "US Promo" was leaked to the internet shortly after the official release. Most tracks are similar to the finished product. However, some tracks, such as "Skin Vision", "Simple Girl", "Sailor" and "You Stick It In Me" (known on the promo as "Life? Question?", are noticeably different and include different music, different melodies and in the case of "Skin Vision", completely different lyrics.

During live concerts, Chris Corner has introduced "Sailor" with the preface, "This is for all you bi-curious people out there".

In 2006, the album was reissued with two additional tracks: "I-Polaroids" and the Moonbootica remix of "Kiss and Swallow". Both "IAMX" and "Kiss and Swallow" are listed as a single track on the reissue. "Kiss and Swallow (Moonbootica Remix)" was previously released on the "Kiss & Swallow" single.

On 17 June 2008 Kiss + Swallow was re-released in the US. This release carries an alternative cover.

Track listing 
All music composed by Chris Corner. All lyrics written by Chris Corner, except where noted.

Original 2004 release:

2006 reissue:

* Lyrics on "Naked But Safe", "Missile" and "White Suburb Impressionism" written by Ian Pickering. Lyrics on "You Stick It in Me" written by Sue Denim.

Charts

References 

2004 debut albums
IAMX albums